Bratislava IV is an okres (district) of Bratislava in the Bratislava Region of Slovakia. It is the largest Bratislava district and covers the north-western parts of Bratislava, including the boroughs of Devín, Devínska Nová Ves, Dúbravka, Karlova Ves, Lamač and Záhorská Bystrica.

It is bordered by the Morava River in the west (which also forms the border with Austria), Malacky District in the north, the Pezinok and Bratislava III districts in the east, Bratislava I district in the south-east, by a short part of Bratislava V district in the south and again by Austria along the Danube river.

 

Boroughs of Bratislava
Districts of Slovakia
Geography of Bratislava Region